Andrew Grigg (born April 25, 1971) is a former Canadian football wide receiver in the Canadian Football League who played eight seasons for the Hamilton Tiger-Cats.

References

Career Stats
Bio

1971 births
Living people
Players of Canadian football from Ontario
Canadian football wide receivers]
Hamilton Tiger-Cats players
Ottawa Gee-Gees football players